Sepietta is a genus of bobtail squid comprising three species.

Species
Genus Sepietta
Sepietta neglecta, Elegant Bobtail
Sepietta obscura
Sepietta oweniana, Common Bobtail

Sepietta petersi, the mysterious bobtail, is regarded as a synonym of S. oweniana.

References

External links

Bobtail squid
Cephalopod genera
Molluscs of the Atlantic Ocean
Molluscs of the Mediterranean Sea
Marine molluscs of Africa
Marine molluscs of Europe
Taxa named by Adolf Naef